A Review Conference of the Rome Statute took place from 31 May to 11 June 2010, in Kampala, Uganda to consider amendments to the Rome Statute of the International Criminal Court. The Rome Statute established the International Criminal Court in 2002 as a permanent tribunal to prosecute individuals accused of the most serious crimes of international concern, and provided that a review conference be held seven years after the entry into force.

Scope
The Review Conference considered amendments to the Rome Statute and the Statute made specific reference to reviewing the list of crimes within the court's jurisdiction. The final resolution when the Rome Statute was signed specifically recommended that the review should reconsider including drug trafficking and terrorism in the list of crimes, and also agreeing on a definition of crimes of aggression so that the court can exercise its jurisdiction over this crime. 

Two amendments to the Rome Statute of the International Criminal Court were adopted. The first one is to extend the jurisdiction of the Court over some war crimes committed in non-international conflicts for which it already had jurisdiction if committed in international conflicts. The second one defines the crime of aggression and lays out conditions for the jurisdiction of the Court to be in force.

The transitional provision of Article 124 regarding the war crimes opt-out was also discussed at the review conference, but it was decided to retain it for the time being.

There was some disagreement as to whether the amendment relating to the definition of the crime of aggression needs ratification by seven eighths of the states parties (as a change of institutional provisions would) to enter into force or if it comes only in force for those countries that have ratified it (as a change of crime provisions would and as the amendment itself puts it). With the latter view prevailing, the United Nations Security Council could also refer to the Court a situation regarding a crime of aggression allegedly committed by a national of a non-state party.

Proposals

General Assembly
In November 2009, South Africa floated a proposal at the Assembly of States Party that the power of the UN Security Council to defer an investigation should also be given to the UN General Assembly. This followed the African Union's unsuccessful attempt to defer the investigation in Darfur.

Drug trafficking
In September 2007, Trinidad and Tobago specifically called for drug trafficking to be included in the list of crimes.

Targeting of journalists
The British television media company ITN wrote to the UK government in 2007 asking them to support an amendment to the definition of war crimes to include the intentional targeting of journalists.

References

International Criminal Court
Diplomatic conferences in Uganda
2010 in Uganda
21st-century diplomatic conferences
2010 in international relations
2010 conferences
Rome Statute of the International Criminal Court
21st century in Kampala